Jones Bar is a former settlement in Nevada County, California. It is located at an elevation of 1073 feet (327 m).

References

Former settlements in Nevada County, California
Yuba River
Former populated places in California